Swami Vishuddhananda (1882-1962), born Jitendranath Rai, was the eighth president of the Ramakrishna Mission, a Hindu reformist organisation adhering to the Vedanta philosophy.

Early life 
From his early life, he came in contact with Sarada Devi, spiritual consort of Sri Ramakrishna and direct disciples of Ramakrishna.

Monastic Life 
In 1906, at the age of 24, he received his initiation from Sarada Devi and 1907 he joined the Ramakrishna Order, and he was noted for his love of solitude and contemplative life. In 1947, he became the Vice President of the Order and in 1962 he became the President of the Order. He died on 16 June 1962 (at the age of 80) after an operation of prostate.

References

 Rama Krishna Math and Mission: President's site - Vishuddhananda (archived 16 January 2008)

Presidents of the Ramakrishna Order
20th-century Hindu religious leaders
Monks of the Ramakrishna Mission
1882 births
1962 deaths